Farooqui; also transliterated as Farooqi, Faruki or Al Farooqui), is a distinct name or surname or last name of Arabic origin.

Notable Farooquis 
 Umar, second Caliph of Islam associate of Muhammad
 Hafsa bint Umar, wife of Muhammad
 Abdullah ibn Umar brother-in-law of Muhammad 
 Farooque (1948), Bangladeshi actor
 Farouk Ruzimatov, Russian ballet dancer
 Farouk Shami, Palestinian-American businessman
 Farouk al-Sharaa, Syrian politician
 Farooq, professional wrestler (ring name) 
 Khwaja Ghulam Farid, Sufi Poet
 Mian Mir ( Sufi saint)
 Baba Fariduddin Ganjshakar (Sufi venerated by Muslims, Hindus and Sikhs)
 Shaikh Ahmad Sirhindi   scholar 
 Muhibullah Allahabadi, Sufi Scholar
 Ibrahim ibn Adham , Sufi saint
 Ismail al-Faruqi, Palestinian-American philosopher
 Sachal Sarmast, Sufi Saint 
 Shaikh Salim Chisti, Sufi Saint 
 Naseer Ahmad Faruqui, Islamic scholar
 Nisar Ahmed Faruqi, Islamic scholar
 Musharraf Ali Farooqui, Canadian writer
 Shad Saleem Faruqi, Malaysian Legal Scholar
 Shah Abdul Aziz  
 Khaliq Ahmad Nizami , academic 
 Dr. Mahmood Ahmed Ghazi, Jurist and scholar
 Munawar Faruqui, Stand-up Comedian, Singer, Influencer, Writer, Rapper, Reality Show winner (Lock Upp)

See also 
 Umar
 Family tree of Umar
 Al-Farooq (book)
 Al Farooq Omar Bin Al Khattab Mosque
 Faruqi dynasty

References

External links
Genealogy Umar Bin Khattab
Al Farooq: The Life of Omar The Great at WorldCat

Islamic culture
Arabic-language surnames
Muhajir communities
Patronymic surnames
Surnames from given names